Vitaliy Tolmachyov (born 21 January 1964) is a Ukrainian football manager and former player.

Club career
Born in Zaporizhia, Ukrainian SSR, Soviet Union, he started playing with FC Metalurh Zaporizhya youth team, and became part of the senior team in 1982. In 1983, he played with FSC Bukovyna Chernivtsi and then he returned to Metalurh and played with them in the 1984 Soviet Second League.  After a spell with FC Vorskla Poltava in 1987, he returned to FSC Bukovyna Chernivtsi this time staying with them two seasons. Then in 1990 he joined FC Gomel, known back then as Gomselmash Gomel.

In 1991 with the fall of Soviet Union Tolmachyov moves abroad to Serbia, back then part of FR Yugoslavia.  First he played with a minor rural club FK Mladost Končarevo during 1991–92, and next season he moved to northern Serbia joining FK Palić. He then moved to FK Spartak Subotica and played with them in the 1993–94 First League of FR Yugoslavia. In summer 1994 he moved to another club from Subotica, FK Bačka 1901, the oldest club on the entire territory of former Yugoslavia.

After two seasons playing with Bačka, Tolmachyov returned home, then already as independent Ukraine.  During the season 1997–98 he played the first half-season with Pishtsevik Popovka, and the second with FC Elektron Romny.

References

1964 births
Living people
Footballers from Zaporizhzhia
Ukrainian footballers
Association football goalkeepers
FC Metalurh Zaporizhzhia players
FC Bukovyna Chernivtsi players
FC Vorskla Poltava players
FC Gomel players
FC Elektron Romny players
FK Palić players
FK Spartak Subotica players
FK Bačka 1901 players
First League of Serbia and Montenegro players
Expatriate footballers in Serbia and Montenegro
Soviet footballers